Perittia minitaurella is a moth of the family Elachistidae. It is found in Greece (Crete).

References

Moths described in 2009
Elachistidae
Moths of Europe